The 2002 United States Senate election in Louisiana  was held on November 5, 2002. Incumbent Democratic U.S. Senator Mary Landrieu won re-election to a second term, although she did not earn 50% of the vote in the first round and was therefore forced into a runoff election with Republican Suzanne Haik Terrell, the Louisiana Elections Commissioner.

During the runoff, Landrieu was outspent three-to-one by Terrell, who also had prominent Republicans including President George W. Bush and Vice President Dick Cheney visit Louisiana to campaign on her behalf. Republicans, confident of victory having gained seats in the elections to the House of Representatives and to the Senate, solidifying control of the former and taking control of the latter, publicly called the election "Operation Icing on the Cake". Some Democrats responded by calling their efforts "Operation Wipe that Smirk off of Bush's Face" and dubbed Landrieu's subsequent run-off victory, "Operation Pie in the Face".

Candidates

Democratic 
 Raymond Brown
 Mary Landrieu, incumbent U.S. Senator

Republican 
 John Cooksey, U.S. Representative
 Tony Perkins, State Representative
 Ernest Edward Skillman
 Suzanne Haik Terrell, Louisiana Elections Commissioner

Independents 
 Live Wire Landry
 James Lemann
 Gary D. Robbins

Initial results

Debates (Jungle primary & runoff)
Complete video of debate, October 24, 2002
Complete video of debate, October 28, 2002
Complete video of debate, October 29, 2002
Complete video of debate, November 17, 2002
Complete video of debate, November 21, 2002
Complete video of debate, November 25, 2002
Complete video of debate, December 2, 2002

Predictions

Results
Landrieu pulled off what many considered to be an upset victory. The Republicans believed they would most likely win the race. Before the election many Republicans called the race operation icing on the cake. After Landrieu won the runoff Democrats dubbed her victory operation pie in the face. The race was close. In terms of rural parishes the vote was split fairly evenly. Landrieu did well in Caddo Parish home of Shreveport, and in East Baton Rouge Parish home of Baton Rouge. Ultimately though it was Landrieu's huge win in Orleans Parish home of New Orleans that pushed her over the finish line. Haik Terrell conceded defeat to Landrieu at 12:38 P.M. EST, congratulating Landrieu on her victory. Landrieu would go on to be reelected to a third term in 2008, but ultimately defeated in her bid for a fourth term in 2014.

See also 
 2002 United States Senate elections

References

External links 
 Elections Division from the Louisiana Secretary of State

2002 Louisiana elections
Louisiana
2002